Cristina Sciolla (born 29 June 1965) is an Italian short track speed skater. She competed in two events at the 1992 Winter Olympics.

At the 1988 Winter Olympic Games in Calgary, Cristina Sciolla won, together with teammates Maria Rosa Candido, Gabriella Monteduro and Barbara Mussio, the gold medal in the 3000m short track relay.

References

1965 births
Living people
Italian female short track speed skaters
Olympic short track speed skaters of Italy
Short track speed skaters at the 1992 Winter Olympics
Sportspeople from Turin
Olympic gold medalists for Italy